The BMW Z18 is a concept car by the former think tank of BMW, BMW Technik GmbH. Unveiled in 1995, the Z18 combined elements of the BMW Z3 with one of an off-road vehicle, to create what BMW dubbed the first "off-road roadster".

Background
BMW Technik GmbH, founded by BMW in 1985, was an independent think tank created to design various vehicles which had radical design elements, interior and exterior. Some of the projects include the BMW E1, an early example of a hybrid electric car. Former Aston Martin CEO Ulrich Bez was the first to head the think tank, under which the Z18 was developed. The Technik division has since been re-integrated back into BMW as its research and development department. Although first developed in 1990, the concept was not shown until 1995.

Design

Exterior
The car possessed similar styling cues (such as the signature kidney grille) compared to other BMWs of the 90s and was based on the BMW Z3. The idea of the Z18 was to combine elements of an enduro motorcycle, off-road vehicle and roadster, the former of which saw a spike in popularity in the 90s. The Z18 retained the body of the Z3 but had significantly higher ride height in order to fulfill its capability as an off-road vehicle. With the increased ride height, BMW claimed that the Z18 was able to navigate shallow water passages with ease.

Interior
BMW did not manufacture a roof for the Z18 seeing as it was a roadster, and in order to accommodate potential water entering the cabin, BMW reduced the number of parts on the dashboard and waterproofed everything within the cabin, along with putting in rubber floor mats. The Z18 also had collapsible rear seats which could be brought upright to turn the car into a four-seater (2+2), along with an option to convert it into a pickup truck.

Powertrain
Fitted with what would eventually be the engine for the first generation of X5, the  produced , which was sent to all wheels via a 5-speed manual and a four-wheel drive system, the latter of which the X5 would also inherit from the Z18.

References

BMW concept vehicles
Cars introduced in 1995